Bathybates minor is a species of fish in the family Cichlidae. It is endemic to Lake Tanganyika where it forms schools and feeds mainly on clupeids, mostly Stolothrissa tanganicae.

References

minor
Taxa named by George Albert Boulenger
Fish described in 1906
Taxonomy articles created by Polbot